Moradlu (also Romanized as Morādlū) is a city in Moradlu District, Meshgin Shahr County, Ardabil province, Iran. At the 2006 census, its population was 645 in 167 households, when it was a village in Arshaq-e Gharbi Rural District. The following census in 2011 counted 761 people in 173 households, by which time the village had become a city. The latest census in 2016 showed a population of 671 people in 218 households.

References 

Meshgin Shahr County

Cities in Ardabil Province

Towns and villages in Meshgin Shahr County

Populated places in Ardabil Province

Populated places in Meshgin Shahr County